The Drama Desk Award for Outstanding Scenic Design of a Musical was an annual award presented by Drama Desk in recognition of achievements in the theatre among Broadway, Off Broadway and Off-Off Broadway productions. The award was originally created in the 1996 ceremony, when the Drama Desk Award for Outstanding Set Design was separated into two categories, for plays and musicals. The award was retired after the 2009 ceremony, before being revived once again in the 2016 ceremony.

Winners and nominees

1990s

2000s

2010s

2020s

See also
 Laurence Olivier Award for Best Set Design
 Tony Award for Best Scenic Design

References

External links
 Drama Desk official website

Set Design